Lloyd Edgar Jackson (January 7, 1912 in Ottawa, Ontario — February 15, 1999) was a Canadian professional ice hockey player who played 14 games in the National Hockey League with the New York Americans during the 1936–37 season. The rest of his career, which lasted from 1931 to 1942, was spent in various minor leagues.

Career statistics

Regular season and playoffs

References
 

1912 births
1999 deaths
Canadian ice hockey centres
Fort Worth Rangers players
Ice hockey people from Ottawa
Kansas City Americans players
New Haven Eagles players
New York Americans players
Seattle Seahawks (ice hockey) players
Springfield Indians players
Syracuse Stars (IHL) players
Tulsa Oilers (AHA) players